Williams Shipping is a marine services & logistics company based in Southampton, England. Its services include vessel chartering, marine operation services, oil spill response, road transport, marine lubricants and container hire.

History 
George Williams founded the company in 1894, after a career working on windjammers.

Marine Fleet

Transport Fleet

In 2014, the company acquired a 100 tonne crawler crane with a boom of 42 metres.

In 2015 the company expanded its transport fleet with Euro-6 DAF XF tractor units to furnish its specialist logistics and general haulage operations. Trucks include three XF 510 FTG Super Space Cabs plated at 65-tonnes, two 44-tonne XF 460 FTG Space Cabs and an XF 460 FTR Space Cab with 47 tonne Hiab Crane.

In 2016 the company purchased a Hyster reach stacker and developed a 1-acre area of its Millbrook site into a cargo handling yard.

Locations 
The company has offices in the Eastern Docks and Millbrook areas of Southampton, in Aberdeen and in Pembrokeshire. Its office in Pembroke Port opened in 2004 as part of a joint venture with Milford Haven Port Authority.

References